Texas's 18th congressional district of the United States House of Representatives includes much of inner city Houston and the surrounding area.  It has been the Downtown Houston district since 1972.  The current Representative from the 18th district is Sheila Jackson Lee.

The district was first represented by Barbara Jordan, the first black woman elected to Congress from the South, who was praised by many for her powerful presence and oratorical skills.

Since the district was moved to Houston in 1972, it has voted for a Democrat in every presidential election. The district gave George McGovern 69% in 1972 and Walter Mondale 72% in 1984.

Election results from presidential races

List of members representing the district

Recent election results

In popular culture

In the TV series The West Wing, Texas's 18th congressional district was represented by fictional Democratic presidential candidate Matt Santos.

Historical district boundaries

See also
List of United States congressional districts

References

 Congressional Biographical Directory of the United States 1774–present

18
Harris County, Texas